A suicide bombing took place at Hamid Karzai International Airport in Kabul, Afghanistan, on 26 August 2021, at 17:50 local time (13:20 UTC), during the evacuation from Afghanistan. At least 183 people were killed, including 170 Afghan civilians and 13 members of the United States military, the first American military casualties in the War in Afghanistan since February 2020. The Islamic State – Khorasan Province (IS-KP) claimed responsibility for the attack.

On 27 August, the United States launched an airstrike which the US Central Command (USCENTCOM) said was against three suspected IS-KP members in Nangarhar Province. On 29 August, the US conducted a second drone strike in Kabul, targeting a vehicle which they suspected was carrying IS-KP members, but actually carried an Afghan aid worker. Ten Afghan civilians were killed in the drone strike, including seven children.

Background

After the fall of Kabul to the Taliban on 15 August 2021, Hamid Karzai International Airport was the only way out of Afghanistan. Security concerns grew after hundreds of members of the Islamic State – Khorasan Province escaped from jails at Bagram and Pul-e-Charkhi. On 16 August, the Pentagon warned the US Congress about the increased threat of a terrorist attack by ISIS following the fall of Kabul the previous day. US President Joe Biden received multiple reports of a possible attack during the week preceding the attack, and warned on 22 August in remarks from the White House that the longer US troops remained in the country, the greater the threat that ISIS would pose to American personnel and civilians near the airport.

Hours before the attack, US diplomats in Kabul warned American citizens to leave the airport because of security threats. United Kingdom Armed Forces Minister James Heappey had also warned of a highly credible threat of attack at the airport by ISIS militants. The embassies of the United States, the United Kingdom and Australia also warned about high-security threats involving the airport.

Attack
Amid the 2021 evacuation from Afghanistan, a crowd of local and foreign civilians fled to the airport to be evacuated. At Abbey Gate, one of the gates into the airport, a suicide bomber detonated an explosive belt. After the explosion, gunfire erupted and all gates to the airport were closed. US officials said that IS-KP gunmen opened fire into the crowd after the explosion and US troops returned fire. According to several reporters, eyewitnesses attributed at least some of the gunfire into the crowd and consequent deaths after the explosion to panic by US troops. The Pentagon acknowledged the possibility of US responsibility for some deaths in a news conference on 28 August.

The explosion occurred by a canal where US forces were checking evacuees' passports, visas and other documentation before allowing them inside the airport. An eyewitness stated that the explosion felt as if someone had pulled the ground from under his feet, and saw other evacuees thrown into the air by the force of the blast. Initial reports erroneously stated that a second explosion had taken place at the nearby Baron Hotel. The following day, it was confirmed that there was no such second explosion.

The attack was carried out by IS-KP, which claimed responsibility and named the bomber as Abdul Rahman Al Logari. The Taliban had fought against IS–KP previously, and were helping the US forces to maintain security at the airport.

Victims

At least 182 people were killed during the attack, including 169 Afghan civilians, and 13 US service members supporting the evacuation operation. Two of the killed civilians were British dual-nationals and one was the child of a British national. It was initially reported that 28 Taliban fighters had also been killed in the attack, but this was later denied by Taliban spokesman Zabiullah Mujahid in an interview with Radio Free Europe/Radio Liberty. The dead Americans were identified as eleven marines, one soldier from 8th Psychological Operations Group, and one Navy corpsman. The American deaths were the first US service deaths in Afghanistan since February 2020 and were the largest single loss of life of US military personnel since the 2011 Afghanistan Boeing Chinook shootdown.

At least 150 more people were injured, including 18 US military personnel and a number of Taliban members.

Reactions and response
Through a tweet by their spokesperson, the Taliban condemned the attack, saying "evil circles will be strictly stopped". The Taliban later announced that they would take every possible measure to capture IS-KP leader, Shahab al-Muhajir. Abdullah Abdullah, former Chief Executive of Afghanistan and current National Coalition of Afghanistan leader, condemned the attack. Some civilians claimed to reporters that the attack had strengthened their resolve to leave the country for fear of more attacks.

US President Biden made a public address following the attack. He honored the US service members who were killed, calling them "heroes" and saying they lost their lives "in the service of liberty", and also expressed deep sorrow for the Afghan victims. Biden said to those who wished harm upon the US that "we will hunt you down and make you pay". The United Kingdom government also said that they will continue Operation Pitting, the evacuation from Afghanistan.

Many nations expressed condemnation for the Kabul airport attack and solidarity with the victims and troops conducting evacuations at the airport. The attack was also condemned by the European Commission and the United Nations. German Chancellor Angela Merkel cancelled an upcoming trip to Israel, and would stay in Germany to monitor the evacuation of German troops. Biden also rescheduled a meeting with visiting Israeli Prime Minister Naftali Bennett because of the attack. The United Kingdom said civilian evacuations would continue in spite of the attack.

US airstrikes

On 27 August, the United States launched an airstrike against what US military said was a vehicle carrying three IS-KP members in Nangarhar Province. Two were killed, who were described by Pentagon Press Secretary John Kirby as "high-profile ISIS targets" and "planners and facilitators"; the third occupant of the vehicle was injured. A US defence official said that one of the strike targets was "associated with potential future attacks at the airport", and that the US had located him with "sufficient knowledge" to strike. CENTCOM identified him on 23 September as Kabir Aidi (alias "Mustafa"), and stated that he was involved in planning attacks and making magnetic IEDs. It also stated that he was directly involved with the orchestrators of the bombing and was reportedly helping distribute explosives and suicide vests to target people during the evacuation. The second person killed in the strike was identified as an ISIS collaborator who had been involved in the 2020 Kabul University attack, but his identity was not known.

On 29 August, a drone strike was carried out by the United States, targeting a vehicle a few kilometers from Kabul Airport. According to relatives, 10 nearby civilians were killed, including seven children. Some of those killed had worked for international organisations and held visas allowing them US entry. US officials said there were a number of explosions following the drone strike, implying explosives at the scene, however victims relatives rejected that any subsequent explosions had occurred and stated the driver of the car did not have any connection with the group. A preliminary investigation conducted into the 29th August drone strike by the American military said the targeted vehicle had visited what was believed to be a safe house for IS-KP by intelligence analysts. It however found no concrete proof that there were explosives inside, though stating it was "possible to probable", and a commander had given the order after seeing no civilians on live feed, only for them to appear a few seconds later.

An investigation conducted by The New York Times however found that the targeted driver, identified as Zemari Ahmadi, was an aid worker for Nutrition and Education International, and that his movements that raised the military's suspicion, was him picking up and later dropping off his office colleagues. It also reported that the packages which were believed to be explosives might have simply been water containers, and there was no evidence of secondary explosions. The newspaper stated that the actual number of dead was 10 people, including 7 children.

Another investigation by The Washington Post reached similar conclusions, with two experts stating that there may have been a smaller secondary explosion due to fuel vapors, which would have appeared more powerful than it actually was, causing the military to believe the vehicle contained explosives. A former US Air force operator claimed the damage was consistent with the car containing explosives.

On 17 September, the head of USCENTCOM Kenneth McKenzie confirmed it was unlikely any IS-KP members were killed in the August 29 drone strike. The Secretary of Defense Lloyd Austin and Chairman of the Joint Chiefs of Staff Mark Milley confirmed all of those killed in the strike were innocent civilians. The investigation by the United States military also concluded that a supposed secondary explosion they believed to be evidence of explosives, might have been due to a propane or gas tank. A CNN report revealed that the Central Intelligence Agency had warned the military of civilians in the area after they fired the missile and only seconds before it struck.

Reactions to the airstrikes
After the drone strike on 27 August, US President Joe Biden said they had pursued those responsible for the attack on the airport as he had previously said they would, and they would continue to do so.

The Council on American–Islamic Relations, Code Pink and Amnesty International condemned the 29 August drone strike, calling it a continuation of American policy of killing civilians without accountability. Amnesty further called for "a credible and transparent investigation" into the strike, acknowledgment by the United States for its actions and reparations for the deceased, and adherence to international law by the United States. US House Representative Ilhan Omar also condemned the strike on Twitter.

Mark Milley defended the strike on 1 September as "righteous" after doubts were raised about it, while claiming one of the persons killed in it was an IS-KP member and they had followed due procedure. He admitted that others were killed in the strike. White House Press Secretary Jen Psaki on 2 September acknowledged that civilians had been killed in the strike and stated that an investigation was ongoing. After the publishing of journalistic reports casting doubt on the military's account, Pentagon spokesman John Kirby on 13 September defended the strike, saying it prevented an attack on the airport.

After the US military confirmed that the drone strike had killed innocent civilians, House Representative Ruben Gallego termed the admission "devastating" and called on the Department of Defense to brief the House of Representatives on it as soon as they could. A relative of the victim meanwhile stated that an apology was not enough and that the United States must punish the person responsible for the strike, offer compensation, and evacuate some members of the family out of Afghanistan.

Notes

See also 
 2023 Kabul Airport attack
 List of terrorist attacks in Kabul

References

Airport attack
2021 murders in Afghanistan
2021 school bombing
21st-century mass murder in Afghanistan
Attacks on buildings and structures in 2021
Attacks on buildings and structures in Kabul
August 2021 crimes in Asia
August 2021 events in Afghanistan
ISIL terrorist incidents in Afghanistan
Islamic terrorist incidents in 2021
Mass murder in 2021
2021 airport attack
Suicide bombings in 2021
2021 airport attack
Terrorist attacks on airports in Asia
Terrorist incidents in Afghanistan in 2021